Tasker Lowndes Oddie (October 20, 1870 – February 17, 1950) was an American attorney and politician who served as the 12th Governor of Nevada and a United States Senator. He was a member of the Republican Party.

Biography
Oddie was born on October 20, 1870, in Brooklyn, New York. He graduated from New York University Law School with an LL.B. in 1895 and practiced law in New York until 1898, when he moved to Nevada to become the attorney and business agent for the wealthy Stokes family.  He joined the Nevada Bar in 1898.

Career
Oddie moved to and made his fortune in the 1900 silver boom in Tonopah, becoming manager of the Tonopah Mining Company. He was the Nye County District Attorney from 1900 to 1902. He was a member of the Nevada State Senate from 1903 to 1906.

He served as governor between 1911 and 1915 (as he was not married at the time, his mother Ellen Oddie and his sisters acted as official hostesses). On March 17, 1911, he signed the city charter for Las Vegas. During his tenure, women got the right to vote, a state motor vehicle law was sanctioned, mining safety legislation was endorsed, and there were improvements to workmen's compensation benefits.

He married Daisy Rendall on November 30, 1916.

He was a senator from 1921 to 1933, losing his bid for a third term to Pat McCarran in 1932. Oddie won the Republican Senate nomination in 1938 but was defeated again by McCarran by a considerably wider margin than in 1932.

Death and legacy
Oddie died on February 17, 1950, in San Francisco at the age of 79. He is interred at Lone Mountain Cemetery, Carson City, Nevada. Mount Oddie near Tonopah is named after him, as is Oddie Boulevard in Reno and Sparks.

References

External links

 
 Loren Chan, Sagebrush Statesman: Tasker L. Oddie of Nevada (University of Nevada Press, Reno, 1973)
National Governors Association
Nevada State Library and Archives
The Political Graveyard
A Guide to the Tasker L. Oddie Scrapbooks and Correspondence, NC585. Special Collections, University Libraries, University of Nevada, Reno.

1870 births
1950 deaths
Republican Party governors of Nevada
Republican Party United States senators from Nevada
District attorneys in Nevada
American Episcopalians
New York University School of Law alumni
Politicians from Brooklyn
Lawyers from Brooklyn
People from Tonopah, Nevada